Attorney General Ellis may refer to:

W. H. Ellis (1867–1948),  Attorney General of Florida
Wade H. Ellis (1866–1948), Attorney General of Ohio